Chrysi Biskitzi, also Khrysa Biskitzi, (born 18 November 1974), is a Greek rower. She competed at the 1996, 2000, 2004 and the 2008 Summer Olympics.

References

1974 births
Living people
Greek female rowers
Olympic rowers of Greece
Rowers at the 1996 Summer Olympics
Rowers at the 2000 Summer Olympics
Rowers at the 2004 Summer Olympics
Rowers at the 2008 Summer Olympics
Rowers from Athens
Mediterranean Games silver medalists for Greece
Mediterranean Games medalists in rowing
Competitors at the 2005 Mediterranean Games